Jean-Marc Adjovi-Bocco (born 22 December 1963) is a Beninese former professional footballer who played as a defender. Bocco captained the Benin national football team, until he retired from international football in the summer of 1997.

In a 2020 interview, Bocco reflected upon his time at Hibernian, saying that he would love to have played for another season in Scotland, but left to make room for younger players following the dismissal of manager Jim Duffy.

References

External links
 
 Profile at sitercl.com 

Living people
1963 births
People from Cotonou
Association football defenders
Benin international footballers
Beninese footballers
Ligue 1 players
Scottish Football League players
Amiens SC players
FC Rouen players
Tours FC players
RC Lens players
Hibernian F.C. players
Beninese expatriate footballers
Beninese expatriate sportspeople in France
Beninese expatriate sportspeople in Scotland
Expatriate footballers in France
Expatriate footballers in Scotland